is the fifth single by Japanese girl group Melon Kinenbi. It was released on February 14, 2002, and its highest position on the Oricon weekly chart was #20.

Track listing

External links
Saa! Koibito ni Narō at the Up-Front Works release list (Zetima) (Japanese)

2002 singles
Zetima Records singles
Song recordings produced by Tsunku
2002 songs